Postplatyptilia antillae is a moth of the family Pterophoridae. It is known from Cuba and Jamaica.

The wingspan is about 18 mm. Adults are on wing in July.

Etymology
The name reflects the origin of the species, being the first to be recorded in the genus Postplatyptilia from the Greater Antillean Islands.

References

antillae
Moths described in 2006